Evgenii Georgievich Dyakonov (July 2, 1935 – August 11, 2006) was a Russian mathematician.

Dyakonov was a Ph.D. student of Sergei Sobolev. He worked at the Moscow State University. He authored over hundred papers and several books. Dyakonov was recognized for his pioneering work in the 60s–80s on efficient spectrally equivalent preconditioning for linear systems and eigenvalue problems. In the last decade, strengthened Sobolev spaces became Dyakonov's main topic of research, e.g., (Dyakonov, 2004).

References

External links
 Evgenii D'yakonov — scientific works on the website Math-Net.Ru
 

 NA Digest, V. 06, # 33 obituary on NA Digest by Andrew Knyazev.

Russian mathematicians
Soviet mathematicians
Numerical analysts
Moscow State University alumni
Academic staff of Moscow State University
1935 births
2006 deaths